The 2001 GMC 400 was the fifth round of the 2001 Shell Championship Series and the second running of the GMC 400 event. It was held on the weekend of 9 to 10 June on the Canberra Street Circuit in Canberra, Australian Capital Territory.

Race report 

The Dick Johnson Racing outfit were very fast right from qualifying with them achieving a one-two, with Radisich achieving a time over half a second faster than his closest competitor, Steven Johnson. However, it would be Johnson that would achieve pole position after Radisich spun during his shootout lapping, dropping him to fifteenth.

Race results

Qualifying

Top Fifteen Shootout

Race 1

Race 2

Race 3

References

GMC